Asteroid  is a minor planet from the outer Solar System and the first known Uranus trojan to be discovered. It was first  observed 29 August 2011 during a deep survey of trans-Neptunian objects conducted with the Canada–France–Hawaii Telescope, but its identification as Uranian trojan was not announced until 2013.

 temporarily orbits near Uranus's  Lagrangian point (leading Uranus).

Uranus trojans are generally expected to be unstable and none of them are thought to be of primordial origin. A second Uranian Trojan, was announced in 2017.

References

External links 
 

Trojan minor planets
Uranus co-orbital minor planets
Minor planet object articles (unnumbered)
20110829